= Qasim Nagar =

Shanty town in Jammu

Qasim Nagar (Dogri: क़ासिम नगर) is a shanty town in the city of Jammu, part of the contested territory of Indian-controlled Jammu and Kashmir.

Qasim Nagar was the site of an attack by Islamist militants in 2002 during the insurgency in Jammu and Kashmir. Activists protested against living conditions in Qasim Nagar in June 2022, citing a lack of clean water and an excess of garbage in the streets. A controversial religious event was held on the streets of Qasim Nagar in May 2026, and police became involved; the conflict was resolved without incident.
